The 2021–22 Liga MX Femenil season was the fifth season of the premier women's football league in Mexico. The season began on 16 July 2021 and finished on 30 May 2022.

Stadiums and locations

Alternate venues 
 América – Cancha Centenario No. 5 (Capacity: 1,000)
 Atlas – Estadio Colomos Alfredo 'Pistache' Torres (Capacity: 3,000)
 Atlas – CECAF (Capacity: 1,000)
 Cruz Azul – Instalaciones La Noria (Capacity: 2,000)
 Guadalajara – Verde Valle (Capacity: 800)
 León – La Esmeralda Cancha Sintética (Capacity: 1,000)
 Mazatlán – Centro Deportivo Benito Juárez (Capacity: 1,000) 
 Monterrey – El Barrial (Capacity: 570)
 Querétaro - Estadio Olímpico Alameda (Capacity: 4,600)
 Toluca – Instalaciones Metepec (Capacity: 1,000)
 UANL – Instalaciones Zuazua (Capacity: 800)
 UNAM – La Cantera (Capacity: 2,000)

Personnel and kits

Format
The Liga MX Femenil season is split into two championships: the Torneo Grita México 2021 (opening tournament) and the Torneo Clausura 2022 (closing tournament). Each is contested in an identical format and includes the same eighteen teams.

Since 2019–20 season the teams compete in a single group, the best eight of the general table are classified to the championship playoffs.

Torneo Apertura
The 2021 Torneo Apertura, officially named Torneo Grita México Apertura 2021, is the first tournament of the season. The tournament was renamed Torneo Grita México 2021 with the intention of fighting homophobia derived from a scream used by fans. The tournament began on 16 July 2021.

Regular season

Standings

Positions by Round

Results
Each team plays once all other teams in 17 rounds regardless of it being a home or away match.

Regular Season statistics

Top goalscorers 
Players sorted first by goals scored, then by last name.

Source:Liga MX Femenil

Hat-tricks 

(H) – Home ; (A) – Away

Attendance

Per team

Source: Liga MX Femenil

Highest and lowest

Source: Liga MX

Liguilla
The eight best teams play two games against each other on a home-and-away basis. The higher seeded teams play on their home field during the second leg. The winner of each match up is determined by aggregate score. In the quarterfinals and semifinals, if the two teams are tied on aggregate, the higher seeded team advances. In the final, if the two teams are tied after both legs, the match goes to a penalty shoot-out.

Quarter-finals
The first legs were played on 3 December, and the second legs were played on 6 December 2021.

First leg

Second leg

Semi-finals
The first legs were played on 10 December, and the second legs were played on 13 December 2021.

First leg

Second leg

Final
The first leg was played on 17 December, and the second leg was played on 20 December 2021.

First leg

Second leg

Torneo Clausura
The Torneo Clausura 2022, officially named Torneo Grita México Clausura 2022, is the second tournament of the season. The tournament began on 7 January 2022.

Regular season

Standings

Positions by Round

Results
Each team plays once all other teams in 17 rounds regardless of it being a home or away match.

Regular Season statistics

Top goalscorers 
Players sorted first by goals scored, then by last name.

Source:Liga MX Femenil

Hat-tricks 

(H) – Home ; (A) – Away

Attendance

Per team

Highest and lowest

Source: Liga MX

Liguilla
The eight best teams play two games against each other on a home-and-away basis. The higher seeded teams play on their home field during the second leg. The winner of each match up is determined by aggregate score. In the quarterfinals and semifinals, if the two teams are tied on aggregate, the higher seeded team advances. In the final, if the two teams are tied after both legs, the match goes to a penalty shoot-out.

Quarter-finals
The first legs were played on 5 and 6 May, and the second legs were played on 8 and 9 May 2022.

First leg

Second leg

Semi-finals
The first legs will be played on 13 May, and the second legs will be played on 16 May 2022.

First leg

Second leg

Final
The first leg were played on 20 May, and the second leg were played on 23 May 2022.

First leg

Second leg

Aggregate table 
The aggregate table (the sum of points of both the Apertura 2021 and Clausura 2022 tournaments) was being used to determine seeds in the Campeón de Campeones.

Campeón de Campeones
On May 24, 2021, the Liga MX Owners Assembly made official the creation of the "Champion of Women's Champions", a tournament between the two winning teams of the season's tournaments made with the goal of premiering the best team in all the annual cycle of Mexican women's football.

Monterrey qualified for this tournament after being champion of the Apertura Tournament and played against Guadalajara, Clausura Tournament winner.

The first leg will be played on 27 May, and the second leg will be played on 30 May 2022.

First leg

Second leg

References

Liga MX Femenil
Mexico
2021–22 in Mexican football